The Rabat–Tangier-Med expressway is an expressway in Morocco. It begins in Morocco's capital of Rabat, and connects to the northern port of Tanger-Med.  The expressway's identity marker is "A5".

The Rabat-Tanger expressway originates at an interchange along the Rabat-Fes expressway, at the end of the Rabat bypass. The road then continues to the toll station at the Kénitra centre interchange, before continuing north towards the Kénitra north interchange where it passes under the RP2 road. Just north of here lies the Kénitra north toll station. The expressway then follows the coast past the fishing village of Moulay Bouselham. 30 km north of there is the town of Larache where there is an intersection. Another 30 km along the way is the interchange at Sidi El Yamani, connecting to the road to Tetouan and Ceuta. There is another intersection at Asilah, with 40 km remaining to Tanger. The road then crosses the Tahaddart river estuary before reaching its final destination.

History
Construction started in 1993 and in 1995 the first section, between Rabat and Kénitra north, was opened. The road was prolonged to Larache in 1996. In 2000, the section to Sidi El Yamani was opened, with Asilah being connected in 2002. In July 2005, 12 years after the start of construction, the totality of the axis was completed.

The axis technically comprises also the Rabat bypass, although it does not conform with motorway regulations. Before its opening in 1997, getting to the origin of the road was a hard task for traffic coming from Casablanca, as the centre of Rabat had to be crossed.

Financial
In 2007 the toll-revenues for this road totaled 269 million dirhams (2006: 212 MDh), taking 2nd place in list of top earners in Morocco (Figure includes sections Tangier-RN2 and Tétouan - M'diq). 
Figures regarding investments for road-construction: (costs per km. in brackets)
 Rabat - Larache  :            1800 MDh  - 13 MDh/km.
 Larache - Sidi El Yamani :     400 MDh  - 15 MDh/km.
 Sidi El Yamani – Asilah  :     440 MDh  - 30 MDh/km.
 Asilah - Tanger :             1400  MDh  - 47 MDh/km.
 TOTAL                  4040  MDh
and also:
 Desserte du port Tanger-Med : 3930 MDh  - 73 MDh/km.

Links and references

Autoroutes in Morocco
E
Expressway